The Peaks of Lyell is a book by Geoffrey Blainey, based on his University of Melbourne MA thesis originally published in 1954. It contains the history of the Mount Lyell Mining and Railway Company, and through association, Queenstown and further the West Coast Tasmania.

It is unique for this type of book in that it has gone to the sixth edition in 2000, and few company histories in Australia have achieved such continual publishing.

Blainey was fortunate in being able to speak to older people about the history of the West Coast, some who had known Queenstown in its earliest years.

The book gives an interesting overview from the materials and people Blainey was able to access in the early 1950s, and the omissions.  Due to the nature of a company history, a number of items of Queenstown history did have alternative interpretations on events such as the 1912 North Mount Lyell Disaster, and there were residents of Queenstown living in the town as late as the 1970s who had stories that differed from the official company history.

Significant characters from the West Coast Tasmania history such as Robert Carl Sticht and James Crotty amongst a longer list probably still deserve further work on their significance in West Coast and Tasmanian history, but the book has had significant "presence" in being in print for so long.

Scholarship on some of the neglected aspects of West Coast and Queenstown history only emerged from the shadow of Blainey's work in the 2000s.
In 1993 for a mining conference in Tasmania, a number of publications were produced regarding the same subject.

In 1994, when the fifth edition of Peaks of Lyell was printed, the Mount Lyell company closed down, and most of the records held by the company were donated to the State Library of Tasmania. By the 2000s a sixth edition was published.

Publication history
 Blainey, Geoffrey. The Peaks of Lyell, Melbourne University Press, Carlton, Vic., 1954, 310pp.
History of Mt. Lyell [manuscript] (M.A. Thesis), University of Melbourne, 1955, 328 leaves.
 The first half of this history was presented as Geoffrey Blainey's Master of Arts thesis.
 2nd ed., Melbourne University Press, Carlton, Vic., 1959, 310pp.
 3rd ed., Melbourne University Press, Carlton, Vic.; London, 1967, 341pp.
 4th ed., Melbourne University Press, Carlton, Vic., 1978, 341pp.
 5th ed., St. David's Park Publishing, Hobart, Tas., 1993, 370pp.
 
 Sound recording of the second edition of the book.

See also
The Companion to Tasmanian History

Notes

1954 non-fiction books
20th-century history books
Books about Australian history
Books by Geoffrey Blainey
Mount Lyell Mining and Railway Company
Queenstown, Tasmania